The Gotha G.III was a twin-engine pusher biplane heavy bomber used by the  Luftstreitkräfte (Imperial German Air Service) during World War I. It succeeded the G.II in production and differed primarily in powerplant and in armament details. The G.II's unreliable V-8 Mercedes D.IV was replaced by the new inline six-cylinder  Mercedes D.IVa engine. The G.III also had a strengthened fuselage with an extra  machine gun firing through a ventral gun tunnel in the belly to protect the underside of the tail.

Operational history
Most of the 25 G.III aircraft produced were delivered to Kampfgeschwader der Obersten Heeresleitung (Kagohl) 1, operating in the Balkans out of Hudova which were under direct control of the Oberste Heeresleitung high command of the German Army. Combat service of the G.III was limited and its most notable accomplishment was in September 1916, when a formation of G.IIIs destroyed a railway bridge over the Danube River at Cernavodă, Romania. It also saw use by Kagohl 2 on the Western Front, operating from Freiburg. Following the delivery of the G.IIIs to this unit, its commander complained to Berlin about the performance of the aircraft because they were outrunning their escort fighters. In September 1917, surviving aircraft were relegated to training units.

Operators

Luftstreitkräfte

Specifications

See also

References

Citations

References

 
 

 

G.III
1910s German bomber aircraft
Aircraft first flown in 1916
Twin-engined pusher aircraft